Pogórze may refer to the following places in Poland:
 Pogórze, Gdynia, a district of the city of Gdynia
Pogórze, Opole Voivodeship (south-west Poland)
Pogórze, Pomeranian Voivodeship (north Poland)
Pogórze, Silesian Voivodeship (south Poland)
Pogórze, Greater Poland Voivodeship (west-central Poland)